Yadel Martí Carrillo (born July 22, 1979) is a Cuban right-handed pitcher.

Career

===

Martí was 1-0 with two saves and no earned runs at the 2006 World Baseball Classic, helping Cuba to a second-place finish. He was named to the all-tournament team.  He also pitched for Cuba in the 2007 Baseball World Cup, coming one out short of a seven-inning perfect game against Venezuela.

Defection
Martí was originally slated to play in the 2009 World Baseball Classic, but he and Yasser Gómez were kicked off the team in November 2008 for an unspecified reason, believed to be an attempted defection to the United States.  Marti, Gómez and Juan Yasser Serrano reportedly defected from Cuba in December 2008 in an effort to get to the Dominican Republic to seek a Major League Baseball career.  In August 2009, they were declared free agents.

Martí pitched in the Dominican Winter Baseball League in the winter of 2009-10 and joined Veracruz of the Mexican League in 2010, going 2-2 with a 4.19 ERA in eight starts.

Oakland Athletics
Martí signed with the Oakland Athletics as a free agent to a Minor League contract on August 6, 2010. Martí was invited to spring training with the Athletics in 2011 as a non-roster invitee. He played the 2011 season with the Stockton Ports of the Class-A Advanced California League, the Midland RockHounds of the Class-AA Texas League, and the Sacramento River Cats of the Class-AAA Pacific Coast League.

Pitching style
Martí pitches with a pause in his delivery, in a similar fashion to many Japanese pitchers.  He possesses a sharp-breaking curveball and a diving changeup to complement his fastball.

See also

 List of baseball players who defected from Cuba

References

External links

 

1979 births
Living people
Baseball players from Havana
2006 World Baseball Classic players
Defecting Cuban baseball players
Stockton Ports players
Midland RockHounds players
Sacramento River Cats players
Pan American Games gold medalists for Cuba
Baseball players at the 2003 Pan American Games
Pan American Games medalists in baseball
Central American and Caribbean Games gold medalists for Cuba
Competitors at the 2006 Central American and Caribbean Games
Central American and Caribbean Games medalists in baseball
Medalists at the 2003 Pan American Games